Norwegian Mobile Army Surgical Hospital (NORMASH) was the Norwegian field hospital in Korea from 1951 to 1954, participating in the United Nations Command operations in Korea.

History
On December 29, 1950 the Norwegian Red Cross received a request for a hospital to help in Korea. During the first days of 1951 a plan was drafted for a field hospital based on the American Mobile Army Surgical Hospital (MASH) with 60 beds and a staff of 83.

On March 2, 1951 the Norwegian Parliament approved the plan for a Norwegian field hospital.

The first group of personnel left Norway on the May 16, 1951, the next group left on May 23. The trip was a long one both in time and distance, and took the men and women of NORMASH from Stavanger to Tokyo via Munich, Nice, Naples, Beirut, Cairo, Karachi, Calcutta, Bangkok and Hong Kong. From Tokyo the personnel were transported to Seoul by military transport aircraft.

NORMASH was first established at Uijongbu, approximately 12 miles north of Seoul. The hospital consisted of both Nissen huts and tents and had a surgery with four operating tables. The hospital was later moved to Tongduchon about 40 miles north of Seoul, and was moved a third time to its final location a few miles further north.

In the first 40 days NORMASH treated 1,048 patients, of which 23 were civilians. All told NORMASH treated 90,000 patients, of which the largest groups were the U.S. (36%), South Korea (33%) and the various British and Commonwealth troops (27%). The unit also treated 172 North Korean and Chinese POWs.

NORMASH performed on average eight surgeries per day, with variations ranging from 1 to 64, and Doctors could spend 24 hours or more performing surgery on a continual stream of wounded arriving from the front.

In the fall of 1951 it was decided to increase the personnel from 83 to 105, and on October 26, 1951 the decision was made to maintain the hospital for the duration of the UN operation in Korea.

The hospital was also changed from a Red Cross hospital to a regular army hospital, and the personnel changed their Red Cross uniforms for regular US army uniforms and ranks. This also included Norwegian Army personnel for close protection of the hospital.

With the signing of the Armistice Agreement on July 27, 1953, the hospital stopped receiving wounded soldiers, but a substantial number of civilian Koreans were now treated. Though an armistice was in effect, the stability of it was questionable, and the hospital was kept at the ready in case of a breaking of the ceasefire.

In the fall of 1953 NORMASH was the only hospital for four divisions in the 1st Army Corps. The hospital was kept awaiting the establishment of a Scandinavian training hospital in Seoul, and it was not until October 17, 1954 that the hospital received orders to return to Norway. Four days later the last patient was released, and on November 10 all equipment was returned to the US Army.

Personnel
In total 623 men and women served in NORMASH over seven contingents, five of which were before the Armistice.  The hospital lost two members killed; driver Arne Christiansen was shot and killed in 1952 and laboratory technician Brit Reisæther was killed in a car accident in 1954.

Awards and commendations
NORMASH twice received the Meritorious Unit Commendation and the Korean Presidential Citation. All personnel also received the Norwegian Korea Medal. Though the most cherished and appreciated "award" is probably the visit by Marilyn Monroe which Major Enebakk reports "made the boys go wild."

References

External links

Norway - the official site in Korea  
 NORMASH - Korea - Norsk Veterannettverk 
 Koreakrigen og det norske feltsykehuset Norwegian Military Journal article by Major (retired) Magnar H. Enebakk 

Military medical organizations
Military history of Norway
Korean War
United Nations contingents in Korea